Davou D. B. Zang was elected Senator for Plateau North Senatorial District of Plateau State, Nigeria at the start of the Nigerian Fourth Republic, running on the People's Democratic Party (PDP) platform. He took office on 29 May 1999.
After taking his seat in the Senate in June 1999, he was appointed to committees on Solid Minerals, Industries, Science & Technology, Communication, Power & Steel, Commerce and Special Projects (vice-chairman).
He ran for reelection in April 2003 but was defeated by Timothy Adudu of the All Nigeria People's Party (ANPP). 
He is scion of the famous tin magnate and philanthropist, Dalo. D. B. Zang.

References

Living people
People from Plateau State
Peoples Democratic Party members of the Senate (Nigeria)
20th-century Nigerian politicians
21st-century Nigerian politicians
1956 births